Blå måndag (Blue Monday) is a 2001 Swedish film directed by Anders Lennberg, starring Eva Röse and Göran Gillinger.

External links

moviemix.nu

2001 direct-to-video films
2001 films
2000s Swedish-language films
2001 crime drama films
Swedish crime drama films
2000s Swedish films